The Winner of the Miss Universe Ireland 2009  was awarded to Diana Donelly. It was held on June 26, 2009, at the Abbey Theatre in Dublin. There the county pageants were present from March to June 1.

Results

Special Awards

Miss Photogenic - Rozanna Purcell (Lillies Bordello)
Miss Congeniality  - Kerri O’Connor (Kerry)
Miss Fashion - Ashley McNicholas (Athlone)
Miss Internet  - Rozanna Purcell (Lillies Bordello)

Contestants

Controversy 
It was reported that the pageant was sponsored by Educogym, a concept gym created by Tony Quinn. At the launch contestants were photographed wearing sashes emblazoned with the Educogym name and it was announced the winner would receive a year's membership. Co-host Lisa Fitzpatrick was reported as saying "If someone wants to read into angels then let them on and if someone else gets help from Tony Quinn's seminars then it can only be doing good for them" despite what many were calling a cult.

References

External links
Official Website

Miss Universe Ireland
2009 in Ireland
2009 beauty pageants